Fred C. Blanck (October 14, 1881 – 1965) was an American food scientist who was involved in the founding of the Institute of Food Technologists (IFT) which was involved in the publishing of food and nutrition articles and books.

IFT founding 
A charter member of IFT when it was founded in 1939, Blanck proposed at the last session of the meeting at the Massachusetts Institute of Technology to have the new society dealing with food science in the United States be called the Institute of Food Technologists. He would serve as president of IFT in 1944-45 and would be named the first winner of the Stephen M. Babcock Award, now the Babcock-Hart Award in 1948.

Career 
During his career, Blanck worked for the H.J. Heinz Company, the Mellon Institute of Industrial Research (Carnegie Mellon University since 1967), and the United States Department of Agriculture.

Selected works 
 A. H, Jr., F.C. Blanck, and F.C. Wooster. (1950). Reviews of Nutritional Data. Pittsburgh: H.J. Heinz Company.
 Blanck, F.C., Ed. (1955). Handbook of Food and Agriculture. New York: Reinhold Publishing Corp.

References 
 Goldblith, S.A. (1993). Pioneers in Food Science, Volume 1: Samuel Cate Prescott - M.I.T. Dean and Pioneer Food Technologist. Trumball, CT: Food & Nutrition Press. p. 102.
 Journal of Agricultural and Food Chemistry. (1955). 3(6):473.
 List of past IFT award winners.
 Reviews of Nutritional Data book information.

American food scientists
Carnegie Mellon University faculty
1881 births
1965 deaths